Carmen Miloglav (born 25 February 1991 in Dubrovnik, Croatia) is a Croatian female basketball player.

External links
Profile at eurobasket.com

Living people
1991 births
Basketball players from Dubrovnik
Croatian women's basketball players
Croatian expatriate basketball people in Spain
Shooting guards
Croatian Women's Basketball League players